Damon Mason (born April 21, 1974) is a former American football defensive back.

Playing career

High school career
Mason played high school football at Destrehan High School.

College career
Mason played college football at the University of Southwestern Louisiana and Jones County Junior College. He spent 1992 as redshirt freshman at Southwestern Louisiana before transferring to Jones County for the 1993 season. In 1994, Mason returned to Southwestern Louisiana and played through 1996. He finished his career at Southwestern Louisiana with 243 total tackles, 28 tackles for loss, four sacks and six interceptions and had his number was retired by the school. In 2018, he was inducted into the University of Louisiana at Lafayette (formerly Southwestern Louisiana) Athletics Hall of Fame.

Professional career
Mason played in the Arena Football League (AFL) for the Orlando Predators, New Jersey/Las Vegas Gladiators, Carolina Cobras, Grand Rapids Rampage, Austin Wranglers, Utah Blaze and New Orleans VooDoo. He retired as the AFL career tackle leader.

Coaching career
In 2014, Mason was hired as the defensive backs coach with the AFL's, New Orleans VooDoo. In 2015, he was an assistant coach at Dunwoody High School in Dunwoody, Georgia. In June 2017, Mason was named defensive coordinator and special teams coach of the Jacksonville Sharks in the National Arena League and in 2018, he was a part-time assistant coach with the team. In 2018, he was announced as head coach of the Louisiana Red Sticks in the National Gridiron League, however, the league did not play that season and he is no longer listed as the coach of the proposed team.

References

External links
Southwestern Louisiana bio

1974 births
Living people
American football cornerbacks
American football safeties
Players of American football from Louisiana
Destrehan High School alumni
Louisiana Ragin' Cajuns football players
Orlando Predators players
New Jersey Gladiators players
Las Vegas Gladiators players
Carolina Cobras players
Grand Rapids Rampage players
Austin Wranglers players
Utah Blaze players
New Orleans VooDoo players
New Orleans VooDoo coaches
People from Destrehan, Louisiana
People from LaPlace, Louisiana
Jacksonville Sharks coaches